Weather Report is the debut studio album by American jazz fusion band Weather Report, released on May 12, 1971 by Columbia Records. The album was reissued by Sony and digitally remastered by Vic Anesini in November 1991 at Sony Music Studios in New York City.

Liner notes
Writing on the back sleeve of the album, Clive Davis, the then president of Columbia Records, opines: "There have always been two kinds of musicians-those who create and those who imitate. Weather Report creates. It is that rare thing in music, an original […] Together these gifted young musicians have created Weather Report, a soundtrack for the mind, the imagination, for opening up heads and hearts."

Critical reception 
Reviewing in Christgau's Record Guide: Rock Albums of the Seventies (1981), Robert Christgau called the album "In a Silent Way played mostly for atmosphere", and went on to write: "The Milesian demi-jazz of side two sounds pretty finky (no misprint intended), but the tone-poem impressionism of side one does its mysterious work. Highlight: the opening mood piece, 'Milky Way,' in which two Silent Way vets, soprano saxophonist Wayne Shorter and pianist Joe Zawinul, make sounds that suggest a carillon approaching a time warp."

Track listing

Personnel
Credits for Weather Report adapted from liner notes.

Weather Report
 Joe Zawinul – electric and acoustic piano
 Wayne Shorter – soprano saxophone
 Miroslav Vitouš – electric and acoustic bass
 Alphonse Mouzon – drums, voice
 Airto Moreira – percussion

Other musicians
 Barbara Burton – percussion (uncredited)
 Don Alias – percussion (uncredited)

Technical
 Wayne Tarnowski – engineering
 Ed Lee – cover design
 Ed Freeman – cover photography
 Shoviza Productions, Inc. – production

Awards
 "Jazz Album of the Year", DownBeat Readers Poll.
 Swing Journal magazine Grand Prix Award (a gold record given for winning the Journal's Readers' and Critics' polls).

References

External links

Weather Report Annotated Discography: Weather Report

1971 debut albums
Columbia Records albums
Weather Report albums